Mauritian diaspora in France are French people with Mauritian descent, or who were born in Mauritius.
Although for its economic stability Australia, New Zealand, United Kingdom and Ireland are the biggest recipients of Mauritian immigration, Mauritius is part of the Commonwealth of Nations.

Notable individuals
Nathacha Appanah, French author
Enzo Couacaud, French tennis player
Vikash Dhorasoo, French footballer
Gustave Kervern, French actor and director

See also

Mauritians
Mauritian diaspora in the United Kingdom
Mauritian Australians
Alix d'Unienville, secret agent

Notes

References

African diaspora in France
Society of France

Ethnic groups in France
Immigration to France by country of origin